The University of Kalyani, established in 1960, is a Government of West Bengal administered, UGC affiliated, NAAC accredited, collegiate Public Research university in Kalyani, West Bengal, India. It offers courses at the Undergraduate, Postgraduate and Doctoral levels.

History
The university was established on 1 November 1960 by 'The Kalyani University Act 1960' of the Government of West Bengal. The University of Kalyani is a State University and its activities are guided by 'The Kalyani University Act, 1981 (amended up to 2001)', enacted by the Government of West Bengal. The Act is supplemented by 'Statutes', 'Ordinances','Regulations' and 'Rules'. This act replaced 'The Kalyani University (Temporary Suppression) Act, 1978', which in turn replaced 'The Kalyani University Act, 1960'. The University Grants Commission accorded recognition to the university.

Campus

The university is placed in an Urban areas setting  touching the boundaries of some green Rural areas. The eastern bank of the Ganges is only 2000 meters from the University and its serene background is only 50 km from Kolkata. It is close to Kalyani Ghoshpara railway station, 10 minutes walking distance to Administration Building from the station, and the other campuses are around it.  During Second world war  this land was under the control of the American army who maintained an Army depot here. Few roadways and other constructions are still there to prove that past history. The Campus spans over a huge area of 400 acres (largest State University of West Bengal based on area).

Organisation and administration

Governance
The Vice-chancellor of Kalyani University is the Chief Executive Officer of the university. On 20th December, 2020 Manas Kumar Sanyal was appointed as Vice-chancellor of the university.

Faculties and Departments 

The University of Kalyani has 37 departments organized into 6 faculty councils. 

Faculty of Science

This faculty consists of the departments of

Mathematics
Physics
Chemistry
Botany
Biochemistry & Biophysics
Ecological Studies
Geography
Microbiology
Molecular Biology & Biotechnology
Environmental Science
Statistics
Zoology
Physiology

Faculty of Engineering, Technology & Management

This faculty consists of the departments of

Computer Science & Engineering
Engineering & Technological Studies
Business Administration

Faculty of Arts & Commerce

This faculty consists of the departments of

Bengali
English
Hindi
Modern Language
Sanskrit
Economics
History
Political Science
Philosophy
Rural Developmental Studies
Library & Information Science
Folklore
Sociology
commerce

Faculty of Education

This faculty consists of the departments of

Lifelong Learning & Extension
Education
Physical Education

Faculty of Music & Fine arts

This faculty consists of the department of

Visual Arts

School of Interdisciplinary Studies

This faculty consists of the departments of

Nanoscience & Nanotechnology
Data Science
Genomic Science

Centers 
Bioinformatics Infrastructure Facility Center
Center for Information Resource Management (CIRM)
ENVIS Center on Environmental Biotechnology
Centre for Bengali Diaspora

Affiliated Colleges 
This university is providing academic guidance and leadership to 57 affiliated colleges and 7 others recognized institutes (as of 1st January, 2020). Colleges are independent from the university but they follow the Course Curriculum of the university. Colleges are headed by the Principal and Professors, Teachers of the colleges are appointed via West Bengal College Service Commission (WBCSC). Colleges have responsibility for admitting Undergraduates and organising their classes. Here are names of total 64 affiliated colleges/other recognized institutes :

Govt./Govt.-Aided General Degree Colleges

1. Asannagar Madan Mohan Tarkalankar College

2. Berhampore College

3. Berhampore Girls' College

4. Bethuadahari College

5. Chakdaha College

6. Chapra Bangaljhi Mahavidyalaya

7. Domkal Girls' College

8. Dr. B.R. Ambedkar College

9. Dukhulal Nibaran Chandra College

10. Dumkal College

11. Dwijendralal College

12. Haringhata Mahavidyalaya

13. Hazi A.K. Khan College

14. Jalangi Mahavidyalaya

15. Jangipur College

16. Jatindra Rajendra Mahavidyalaya

17. Kalyani Mahavidyalaya

18. Kanchrapara College

19. Kandi Raj College

20. Karimpur Pannadevi College

21. Krishnagar Government College

22. Krishnagar Women's College

23. Krishnath College

24. Lalgola College

25. Murshidabad Adarsha Mahavidyalaya

26. Muzaffar Ahmed Mahavidyalaya

27. Nabadwip Vidyasagar College

28. Nabagram Amar Chand Kundu College

29. Nagar College

30. Nur Mohammad Smriti  Mahavidyalaya

31. Panchthupi Haripada Gouribala College

32. Plassey College

33. Pritilata Waddedar Mahavidyalaya

34. Prof. Sayed Nurul Hasan College

35. Raja Birendra Chandra College

36. Ranaghat College

37. Rani Dhanya Kumari College

38. Sagardighi Kamada Kinkar Smriti Mahavidyalaya

39. Santipur College

40. Srikrishna College

41. Sripat Singh College

42. Sewnarayan Rameswar Fatepuria  College

43. Subhas Chandra Bose Centenary College

44. Sudhiranjan  Lahiri  Mahavidyalaya

45. Tehatta Government College

46. Muragacha Government College

47. Government General Degree College, Kaliganj

48. Government General Degree College, Chapra

Self-financed General Degree Colleges

1. Institute of Mass Communication Film & Television Studies

2.  G. D. College

Govt.-aided B.P.Ed. College

1. Union Christian Training College

Self-financed B. P. Ed. Colleges

1. Prabharani Institute of Education

2. Sunil Dhar Memorial B.P.Ed. College

Self-financed Law Colleges

1. Bimal Chandra College of Law

2. J.R.S.E.T. College of Law

3. Mohammad Abdul Bari Institute of Juridical Science

4.  S. K. Acharya Institute of Juridical Science

Other Recognized Institutes

1. Central Sericultural Research and Training Institute

2. Kalyani Technology Academy

3. Tagore School of Rural Development and Agricultural Management

4. 	Dr. K.R. Adhikary College of Optometry & Paramedical Technology

5. Monarch College of Art and Technology

6. Susrijo Institute of Paramedical Technology and Optometry

7. Susrijo Institute of Agricultural Science, Technology and Management

Academics

Accreditation
In 2015, University of Kalyani has been awarded A grade (CGPA 3.12) by the  NAAC.

Achievements
 Hepatitis C nosode was developed by Rajesh Shah with a group of  Molecular Biologists at the University of Kalyani, where it was demonstrated that the nosode sourced from Hepatitis C virus could produce anti-Cancer effect on cell lines in a laboratory model. This was one big achievement by the Biologists in the field.

Rankings

University of Kalyani has ranked in the 501-550 band among the top 600 Universities in Asia category by the QS Asia Ranking 2020. It also ranked in the 96-100 band among the top 100 Universities in India category by the QS India Ranking 2020. The university has ranked 89 among universities in India by the National Institutional Ranking Framework (NIRF) in 2020 and in the 101-150 band overall.

Notable alumni

 Arijit Singh, Indian playback singer, composer and music producer
 Koushik Kar, Indian Actor
 Mihir Kanti Chaudhuri, Indian Chemist
 Bimalendu Sinha Roy, Indian Politician
 Susmita Bose, Indian-American Scientist and Professor
 Jagannath Sarkar (BJP politician), Indian Politician
 Manoj Chakraborty, Indian Politician
 Babar Ali (teacher)

See also

References

External links

University Grants Commission
National Assessment and Accreditation Council

 
Universities and colleges in Nadia district
Kalyani, West Bengal
Educational institutions established in 1960
1960 establishments in West Bengal
Universities established in the 1960s